Daha or DAHA may refer to:

Places

India 
 Daha, Karnal, a village in Karnal district of Haryana state of India
 Daha, Bagpat, India

Nepal 
 Daha, Bheri, Nepal
 Daha, Karnali, Nepal

Other places 
 Daha (modern Kediri, East Java), the capital of Kediri Kingdom in East Java

Other uses 
 DAHA, the abbreviation for double affine Hecke algebra
 Daha ("More"), a 2017 Turkish film, directed by Onur Saylak
 Macro-Daha languages of South America